Konongo Odumase Senior High School is a coeducational second-cycle institution at Konongo-Odumase in the Asante Akim Central District of the Ashanti Region of Ghana.

History
The school was started as Konongo Odumasi Secondary School but was renamed Konongo Odumase Senior High School around 2005 when the Kufuor government decided to redesignate all Senior Secondary Schools in the country as Senior High School. with twenty-one boys and five girls. This was as part of the "Accelerated Development Plan for Education" started after Kwame Nkrumah's Convention People's Party won the 1951 Gold Coast legislative election. Two important teachers at the inception of the school were D. A. Agyei and B. Spio-Garbrah. The school moved to its current permanent site in 1963. The original school site was nicknamed Biafra, after the secessionist state of Biafra associated with the Nigerian Civil War.

The school expanded to include a Sixth form, running Advanced level courses in the 1965 / 1966 academic year.

The school crest was designed by B. Spio Garbrah, the first headmaster and also an artist. The first head boy of the school was S. K Obeng

Riots
In November 2016, there were riots among the students which led to the temporary closure of the school. This was because the students wanted the headmistress of the school to be removed.

Notable alumni

Kwadwo Owusu Afriyie – General Secretary of the New Patriotic Party and chief executive officer of the Forestry Commission.
Samuel Ofori Amponsah – musician
Papa Arko – 1983 African Cup of Champions Clubs winner
Yaa Ntiamoah Badu – Former Pro Vice Chancellor of the University of Ghana
Paul Baffoe-Bonnie – Supreme Court Judge
Daasebre Oti Boateng - Ghanaian statistician, academic and Omanhene (paramount chief) of New Juaben in the Eastern Region
Charles de Graft Dickson – Member of Parliament in the First Republic and Minister of Defence.
Dorcas Gyimah – Ghanaian Sprinter
Mohammed Rabiu – Footballer
Afia Amankwaah Tamakloe – TV and radio personality, journalist
Kofi Wampah – Former Governor of the Bank of Ghana

See also

 Education in Ghana
 List of senior high schools in the Ashanti Region

References

External links
 , the school's official website

1953 establishments in Gold Coast (British colony)
Ashanti Region
Educational institutions established in 1953
High schools in Ghana
Education in Accra
Boarding schools in Ghana
Public schools in Ghana